Chenar (also Romanized as Chenār) is a village in Hamzehlu Rural District, in the Central District of Khomeyn County, Markazi Province, Iran. At the 2006 census, its population was 351, in 118 families.

References 

 Populated places in Khomeyn County